Eurrhypis guttulalis is a species of moth in the family Crambidae. It is found in France, Spain, Portugal, Italy, Croatia, Bosnia and Herzegovina, Romania, Bulgaria and Greece.

References

Moths described in 1848
Eurrhypini
Moths of Europe